Orocrypsona is a genus of moths belonging to the family Tineidae.

Species
Orocrypsona periacantha Gozmány, 2004
Orocrypsona punctirama Gozmány, 2004
Orocrypsona rhypala Gozmány, 2004

References

Tineidae
Tineidae genera